D210 is a state road in Podravina region of Croatia connecting Gola and the nearby Gola border crossing to Slovenia to the town of Virje on the D2 state road.

The road, as well as all other state roads in Croatia, is managed and maintained by Hrvatske ceste, state owned company.

Traffic volume 

Traffic is regularly counted and reported by Hrvatske ceste, operator of the road.

Road junctions and populated areas

Sources

State roads in Croatia
Koprivnica-Križevci County